Shrimant Peshwa Baji Rao II (10 January 1775 – 28 January 1851) was the 13th and the last Peshwa of the Maratha Empire. He governed from 1795 to 1818. He was installed as a puppet ruler by the Maratha nobles, whose growing power prompted him to flee his capital Poona and sign the Treaty of Bassein (1802) with the British. This resulted in the Second Anglo-Maratha War (1803–1805), in which the British emerged victorious and re-installed him as the titular Peshwa. In 1817, Baji Rao II joined the Third Anglo-Maratha War against the British, after they favoured the Gaekwad nobles in a revenue-sharing dispute. After suffering several battle defeats, the Peshwa surrendered to the British, and agreed to retire in return for an estate at Bithoor and an annual pension.

Personal life

Baji Rao was the son of the former Peshwa Raghunathrao and his wife Anandibai. Raghunathrao had defected to the English, causing the First Anglo-Maratha War, which ended with the Treaty of Salbai. Baji Rao was born in 1775, when both his parents were kept in imprisonment by the then Peshwa's cabinet. Until the age of 19, he along with his brothers were kept in confinement and denied even basic rights of education.

Raghunathrao's successor as Peshwa, Madhavrao II, committed suicide in 1795, and died without an heir. A power struggle ensued among the Maratha nobles for control of the Confederacy. The powerful general Daulat Rao Scindia and minister Nana Fadnavis installed Baji Rao II as a puppet Peshwa. Baji Rao II had to carry the unfortunate legacy of his parents who, despite being from the same Brahmin family, were suspected of being involved in the murder of the young fifth Peshwa Narayanrao in 1774. As such, being the son of suspected murderers, he was looked down upon by his ministers, nobility, and even by his subjects. His every action was viewed with prejudice and it is said that though regarded as a good administrator and builder of modern-day Pune, he was often labeled as incapable and a coward Peshwa.

Pandita Ramabai has criticized him in her writings for marrying, at the age of 60, a girl who was only 9 or 10 years old.

Holkar's conquest of Poona
After the death of Nana Fadnavis in 1800, Daulat Rao Scindia took complete control over the Peshwa's government. As Scindia started eliminating his rivals within the government, Peshwa Baji Rao II became concerned about his own safety. He turned to British resident Colonel William Palmer for help. General Arthur Wellesley was already in the southern parts of Maratha territory at that time, having concluded a campaign against Dhondia Wagh. However, Baji Rao was reluctant to sign a treaty with the British. In 1802, Scindia's rival chief Yashwant Rao Holkar marched towards Poona. He proclaimed allegiance to the Peshwa, and sent assurances that he only wanted to free Poona of Scindia's control. But Baji Rao was apprehensive since he had earlier ordered the killing of Yashwant Rao's brother Vithoji Rao Holkar. He sought help from Scindia, who was away from Poona at that time. Scindia dispatched an army that arrived in Poona on 22 October 1802. Holkar defeated the joint forces of Peshwa and Scindia in the Battle of Hadapsar on 25 October.

On the morning of 25 October, before the battle, Baji Rao had already sent preliminary terms for a treaty to the British. After the Holkar victory in the battle, he fled to Vasai, where he sought assistance from the British in Bombay. Holkar set up an ad hoc council headed by Baji Rao's adoptive brother Amrut Rao, and ran the Peshwa's government in Amrut Rao's name.

Treaty with the British
Baji Rao II concluded the Treaty of Bassein in December 1802, in which the British agreed to reinstate Baji Rao II as Peshwa, in return for allowing into Maratha territory a force of 6,000 infantry troops complete with guns, and officered by the British, paying for its maintenance and accepting the stationing of a permanent British political agent (Resident) at Poona. Holkar and Sindhia resisted the British intrusion in Maratha affairs, which resulted in the Second Anglo-Maratha War of 1803–1805.

The British triumphed, and the Marathas were forced to accept losses of territories due to internal rivalries between Holkars and Scindias, and treachery committed in all the battles by Scindia's French and other European officers, who mostly handled the imported guns within the Maratha army—the Marathas failing to train their own men in sufficient numbers to handle imported guns.

Third Anglo-Maratha War

The raids of the Pindaris, irregular horsemen who resided in the Maratha territories, into British territory ultimately led to the Third Anglo-Maratha War of 1817–1818, which ended in the defeat of the Bhosles, Holkars, and other Maratha feudatories. In the mid-1810s, the British had intervened in a financial dispute over revenue-sharing between the Peshwa and Gaekwads of Baroda. On 13 June 1817, the Company forced Baji Rao II to sign an agreement renouncing claims on Gaekwad's revenues and ceding large swaths of territory to the British. This treaty of Poona formally ended the Peshwa's titular overlordship over other Maratha chiefs, thus officially ending the Maratha confederacy.

On 5 November 1817, the British Resident at Poona was attacked by Baji Rao II's army led by his Attorney Mor Dixit. Bajirao II could have won this battle had he not halted the progress of his forces by succumbing to the request of British Resident Elphinstone for a ceasefire. Baji Rao watched the battle that ensued between his troops and the British from a hill now called Parvati. This battle on 5 November 1817, referred to as the Battle of Khadki, resulted in Peshwa's defeat.

Afterward, his troops moved to Garpir on the outskirts towards present-day Solapur Road to block the British troops coming from Jalna, but the treason of one of Baji Rao's chiefs, Sardar Ghorpade Sondurkar, led to his force withdrawing. Subsequently, Baji Rao captured Chakan Fort from the British troops. Meanwhile, the British placed Poona under Colonel Burr, while a British force led by General Joseph Smith pursued the Peshwa. Towards the end of December, Colonel Burr received news that the Peshwa intended to attack Pune, and asked the Company troops stationed at Shirur for help. The troops dispatched from Shirur came across the Peshwa's forces, resulting in the Battle of Koregaon. The Peshwa was unsuccessful in defeating the Shirur contingent, and was forced to retreat fearing the arrival of a bigger Company force led by General Smith.

Surrender and retirement

Five British columns set out after Baji Rao II in full cry, slavering at the thought of the 'prize money' that lay at the end of the chase. After running for five months from one fort to another, awaiting the promised help from Scindias, Holkars, and Bhosles that did not come, Baji Rao II surrendered to Sir John Malcolm. Much to the chagrin of the company's Governor-General Francis Rawdon-Hastings, 1st Marquess of Hastings (no relation to Warren Hastings, the first Governor-General of India), Malcolm agreed to keep Baji Rao a lifelong prince, allow him to retain his personal fortune, and pay him an annual pension of £80,000 (£100,000 according to some sources) every year. In return, Baji Rao II would have to live in a place assigned by the British along with his retainers and agree to the condition that he would never return to his homeland, Poona. He would also have to forsake all his claims to his heritage and could not style himself as Peshwa, but there was no objection to calling himself 'Maharaja'. The only reason why Francis Rawdon-Hastings ratified the treaty made by Malcolm was his conviction that Baji Rao II would not live long as he was already above 40 and many of his ancestors did not live much beyond that age.

To keep Baji Rao II under watchful eyes, the British selected a small village on the right bank of the Ganges at a place called Bithur near Kanpur, where they had a large military establishment then. The place selected was exactly six square miles in area and in it, together with his relatives and others who moved from Poona along with him in 1818, there were about 15,000 inhabitants. He had once ruled 50 million. Contrary to the company's wishes, Baji Rao lived for another 33 years and died in 1851 at Bithur.

There were many stories making the rounds in the Court of Gwalior about Baji Rao II, where Manohar Malgonkar's grandfather P. Baburao was a minister. One such story was about the ghost of a slain Peshwa, Narayan Rao, haunting Baji Rao throughout his life, that was widely known to many people due to Baji Rao II's unceasing efforts to exorcise the ghost. Narayan Rao was the ninth Peshwa who was allegedly murdered with the connivance of Baji Rao's parents, as was mentioned earlier. In order to get rid of the ghost, Baji Rao employed the priests of Pandharpur, a temple town of Maharashtra on the banks of the Chandrabhaga. Initially, the priests succeeded in driving away the ghost and in gratitude, Baji Rao II ordered the building of a riverside embankment in Pandharpur, which still bears his name. However, when Baji Rao II was exiled to Bithur, the ghost re-appeared and started haunting again. Since he was forbidden to visit his homeland, he performed religious penances prescribed by the priests of Benares (Varanasi) and was extravagant in distributing alms to Brahmins. He built temples, bathing ghats, performed endless poojas (religious prayers), underwent countless stringent fasts, fell at the feet of sadhus and soothsayers, etc., but the ghost wouldn't leave him. It stayed with him until the end, warning him that his line would end with his successor, his house would burn to ashes, and his clan would perish. Incidentally, after the flare-up of the Indian Rebellion of 1857, Company troops, in July that year, after their successful re-capture of Kanpur under Major-General Henry Havelock initially and later under the then Brigadier James Hope Grant, sacked and burnt down Bithur, including the residence (wada) of Baji Rao II, where many members of his extended family except his adopted son, Nana Sahib, resided.

In popular culture
 The Marathi historical novelist N. S. Inamdar has written two books on the career of Peshwa Baji Rao II. The last Peshwa has been much-maligned by historians. In these novels, Inamdar tries to show the Peshwa in a different light. A person who was imprisoned in his childhood for a crime which was supposedly committed by his mother Anandibai, a person who came to the Peshwai not knowing the ABCs of politics, and a person who was in the wrong place at the wrong time.
 The first of the books, "Jhep" (1963), is actually based on the life of Trimbakji Dengle, who was a guard of the Peshwa and rose to become his chief minister (Karbhari). He helped the Peshwa resurrect the Peshwai from the ruins after the Second Anglo-Maratha War. He also tried to form a sort of coalition with some kings to try to overthrow British rule. In this he failed and the British framed him in the murder of the eminent Gangadhar Shastri (chief minister of the Gaekwad), and he was arrested. The Peshwa wasn't willing to give up his much-valued prime minister and was prepared to start a war against the British, but Trimbakji asked him to lie low and wait until the right time has come.
 The second book, "Mantravegala" (1969), is a sort of continuation of "Jhep". The difference is that "Jhep" deals more with the personal life of Trimbakji whereas "Mantravegala" deals with the personal life of Baji Rao between the years 1817 and 1818, and the Third and last Anglo-Maratha war. In the initial part of the book, Baji Rao is very angry that the English are constantly interfering in the affairs of the Maratha kingdom to a great extent. He is secretly making plans to destroy the British once and for all. He knows it will not be possible but wants to attempt it nonetheless. He frees Trimbakji from the prison in which the British have imprisoned him but refuses to acknowledge to Mounstuart Elphinstone that he was behind the release. Also, some Maratha chieftains are aiding marauders called the Pindaris who have harassed the British. They ask the Peshwa to stop the chieftains from aiding the Pindaris, which he says he cannot do. Finally, the Pindari War takes the form of the Anglo-Maratha war. In the initial part of the war, Baji Rao wins some battles as the British are caught unawares. But the British manage to defeat the Maratha chieftains and finally Baji Rao himself. He is made to give up the Peshwai (which is abolished) and is exiled to Bithur (near Kanpur). The book very beautifully captures the Peshwa's feelings and thoughts. His hatred of the British, his acknowledgement of his past mistakes (like refusing to accept Yashwantrao Holkar), his sadness at not being able to raise any children (all his children died very early or were stillborn), and also his last tearful farewell to Trimbakji at the end of the book.

Television & film
 In the 2001 Hindi historical drama series 1857 Kranti, telecasted on DD National, Bajirao II is played by Lalit Mohan Tiwari.
 In the 2019 Hindi film Manikarnika: The Queen of Jhansi, Suresh Oberoi played the character of the exiled Peshwa.

See also
 Treaty of Poona

References

Further reading
 Malgonkar, Manohar; Devil's Wind, Orient Paperbacks, New Delhi, 1972
 Vaidya, Dr. SG; Peshwa Bajirao II and the downfall of the Maratha power (5th ed.) 1976, Pragati Prakashan, Nagpur, India.
 Dr.Suman Vaidya,"Akhercha Peshwa" (Marathi) Pragati Prakashan, Nagpur 

1775 births
1851 deaths
Peshwa dynasty
People from Pune
People from Kanpur
People from Dhar
People of the Second Anglo-Maratha War
People of the Maratha Empire
Marathi people
19th-century Indian monarchs
Indian Hindus